Carson Valley gaming area consists of 11 casinos in the limits of Carson City, Nevada plus three casinos in Douglas County that are physically located in the same valley. The three casinos in Douglas County are:

 Carson Valley Inn
 Sharkey's Nugget                  
 Topaz Lodge And Casino                 

The casinos in the valley are small compared to the ones in Reno/Sparks. None of them earned more than $72 million in fiscal year 2008. Collectively they have 700 rooms with none more than 152 rooms.

Carson City, Nevada
Douglas County, Nevada
Gambling in Nevada